Amers  is a collection of poetry by French writer Saint-John Perse, published in 1957. Perse won the Nobel Prize in Literature three years later.

The title means "sea marks" (points used to navigate at sea, both manmade and natural); it possibly puns on the French amer(s), "bitter", perhaps meaning "briny" here, and has echoes of mer, "sea".

Amers was ranked #97 in Le Monde's 100 Books of the Century.

References

French poetry collections
1957 poetry books